The Court Concert is a 1936 German historical romantic comedy film directed by Detlef Sierck (later known as Douglas Sirk), and starring Mártha Eggerth, Johannes Heesters, and Kurt Meisel. It was made by the largest German studio UFA, based on Das kleine Hofkonzert. It is part of a group of operetta films made during the 1930s. The film was made at the Babelsberg Studios in Berlin with sets designed by the art director Fritz Maurischat. A separate French-language version was also made.

It was remade by Tobis Film in the later stages of the Second World War using agfacolor, but the resulting film didn't get a release until 1948.

Synopsis
In the small principality of Immendingen in Germany in 1847, the annual court concert at the palace is in danger of being cancelled, because the court singer Tamara Pinelli has lost her voice due to a broken heart. The Prince sends to Munich for a renowned singer named Belotti, to replace Pinelli. At the same time, the young Christine Holm arrives in Immendingen. Christine's mother has recently died, and she is looking for her father, who met her mother in Immendingern. At the border, Christine meets a border guard, Lieutenant Walter von Arnegg, who falls in love with her. When Christine is accused of being a loose woman by a fellow traveler on her coach, Walter defends Christine and pretends to be her fiancee in order to protect her honor. Walter and Christine begin dating and fall in love.

Christine has brought a poem with her to Immendingen that her mother always carried with her as the only memento of Christine's father. Christine traces the poem's origin to an impoverished poet named Knips, who writes poems for cash for local lovers. Christine visits Knips in his garret apartment and tells him about her search. Knips tells Christine that her mother was once a singer at the royal court. He knew her briefly, and he only knows that Christine's father was a high-ranking man from the royal court. Before Christine can investigate any further, she is expelled from the principality by Minister of State von Arnegg, who wants to end his son's improper relationship with this illegitimately born woman, who does not know her own father, as soon as possible. Walter escorts Christine to the border, on orders from his father. At the border they encounter the coach that was sent to Munich to find Belotti. The driver complains that he failed, but Christine laughs and explains that Belotti is her own stage name. Christine is Belotti. Christine returns to the court of Immendingen with an escort of honor and is presented to the Prince.

Christine continues her search for her father, but her mother's files are locked away in the city archives by order of State Minister von Arnegg. Christine comes to believe that von Arnegg is her father and ends her relationship with Walter, believing him to be her brother. During the rehearsals for the court concert, Pinelli becomes angry at having been replaced and burns the only text of the song that is performed every year, but Christine stuns everyone when she knows the lyrics to the song, which was never performed outside of the palace - it was her mother's favorite song. During the concert, the Prince learns the name of Christine's mother and is overcome with emotion as he listens to Christine sing the same song her mother did, on the same stage her mother did. After the concert, the Prince invites Christine to stay on at court as a chamber singer and tells her she can marry Walter, but Christine refuses because she could not marry her brother. The Prince then reveals that he is her father, and Christine and Walter get engaged. The Prince also invites Knips to live at court, at Christine's suggestion, and appoints him the court poet.

Cast

References

Bibliography

External links 
 

1936 films
Films of Nazi Germany
German historical comedy films
German romantic comedy films
1936 romantic comedy films
1930s historical comedy films
Films set in the 19th century
Operetta films
Films based on operettas
1930s German-language films
Films directed by Douglas Sirk
German multilingual films
German black-and-white films
UFA GmbH films
1930s historical romance films
1936 multilingual films
1930s German films
Films shot at Babelsberg Studios